Md. Zahirul Islam is a Major General of Bangladesh Army and incumbent Master General of Ordnance at Army Headquarters. Prior to join here, he was commander of the logistics area of Dhaka Cantonment. He is the chief patron of Baridhara Scholars' International School and College. He is the vice-president of Kurmitola Golf Club. He is the senior vice-president of Bangladesh Golf Federation.

Career 
Islam had served as a faculty at the National Defence College of Bangladesh Army.

On 29 July 2020, Islam was transferred from Bangladesh Army to the Ministry of Commerce and made chairperson of Bangladesh Tea Board. Under him, Bangladesh Tea Board organized the National Tea Day in June 2021. He is the founding chairperson of Camellia Open Sky School, a charity school for children of tea workers.

References 

Living people
Bangladesh Army generals
Year of birth missing (living people)
National Defence College (Bangladesh) alumni